The women's dual moguls competition of the FIS Freestyle World Ski Championships 2011 was held at Deer Valley, United States on 5 February.

Qualification

Elimination round

References

Dual moguls, women's